Jetpack man or guy in a jetpack or Iron Man is an unknown person or object that has been observed flying what appears to be an unauthorized jetpack around the Los Angeles California area at least five times in 2020–21. It is unknown whether each sighting is the same person, or whether it might be a drone designed to look like a person with a jetpack. Neither jetpacks nor large drones are commonly flown at that altitude or at that distance from land, and there have been no sightings of a takeoff or landing. It has been theorized by the FBI and FAA that the Jetpack man is actually a balloon.

Sightings

First sighting
American 1997: "Tower, American 1997, we just passed a guy in a jetpack... Off the left side, maybe  or so, about our altitude."

Skywest pilot: "We just saw the guy passing by us in the jetpack."

Second sighting
In November of 2020, a Los Angeles Police Department helicopter crew recorded a video of what appeared to be a balloon of fictional character Jack Skellington. The video was recorded over the Beverly Hills area. A balloon is believed by many to be the explanation for the phenomenon. The behavior of the balloon was similar in the footage to the jetpack man as it had and would later be described.

The LAPD only released the footage in November of 2021. The Federal Bureau of Investigation released a statement on the matter and said: 
Then adding later on that:

Third sighting

Fourth sighting
On December 21, 2020, a pilot and flight instructor with Sling Pilot Academy captured the first video of such a flying object, at around  near Palos Verdes and Catalina Island (south of Los Angeles). The academy posted the video to their Instagram account, commenting:"The video appears to show a jet pack, but it could also be a drone or some other object. If it is a ‘guy in a jet pack’ then it remains to be seen whether it is a legal test flight... or related to the jet pack sightings near LAX recently that caused disruptions to air traffic."

Fifth sighting
In air traffic control chatter, the flying object was referred to variously as "the UFO” and “Iron Man”.747 pilot: "Possible jetpack man in sight... about 5000"  ...

LAX Tower: "Skywest 3626, did you see the... did you see the UFO?" 

Skywest 3626 pilot: "We were looking but we did not see Iron Man" 

Tower: "Attention all aircraft, use caution for the jetpack. He is just north of the final, around 5000 at Gate C, last reported"  ...

Other pilot: "Where'd you say iron man was flying around again?"

Tower: "Around 5000, reported by a heavy 74 on a 15-mile final."

Sixth sighting

Approximately June 2022.

See also 
 Balloon boy hoax
 Lawnchair Larry flight

References

Unidentified flying objects
Culture of Los Angeles